Events from the year 2009 in Croatia.

Incumbents
President – Stjepan Mesić
Prime Minister – Ivo Sanader (until 6 July), Jadranka Kosor (starting 6 July)
Speaker – Luka Bebić

Events
April 1 – Croatia became a full member of NATO.
July 1 – Ivo Sanader resigns as the Prime Minister of Croatia and President of Croatian Democratic Union.
July 3 – First Swine Flu case was confirmed by a female from Australia
July 6 – Jadranka Kosor of the Croatian Democratic Union becomes Prime Minister.
July 24 – Six people are killed and 55 are injured in the Rudine train derailment.
December 27 – The first round of presidential elections are held.

Arts and literature
Igor Cukrov won Dora 2009 on February 28 to become Croatia's representative at the Eurovision Song Contest 2009.

Sport
Marin Čilić won the 2009 Chennai Open on January 10.
2009 World Men's Handball Championship held in Croatian cities from January 16–February 1.
K-1 Croatia 2009 held in Split on March 21.
Blanka Vlašić successfully defended her high jump world title on August 20.
The 2009 Golden Spin figure skating competition is held in Zagreb December 10–12.

Deaths
January 14 – Dušan Džamonja, sculptor (born 1928)
January 17 – Tomislav Crnković, footballer (born 1929)
March 16 – Boris Mutić, sports reporter (born 1939)
June 9 – Zvonimir Berković, film director (born 1928)
June 19 – Dalibor Brozović, linguist and politician (born 1927)
July 14 – Vera Fischer, sculptor (born 1925)
August 3 – Ivan Milat-Luketa, painter and sculptor (born 1922)
August 6 – Savka Dabčević-Kučar, politician (born 1923)
August 28 – Emil Glad, actor (born 1929)
September 6 – Vanja Drach, actor (born 1932)
September 6 – Nada Iveljić, children's author (born 1931)
December 2 – Vjekoslav Šutej, conductor (born 1951)

See also
2009 in Croatian television

References

 
Years of the 21st century in Croatia
Croatia